"Do You Get Enough Love" is a 1986 R&B ballad by The Jones Girls vocalist, Shirley Jones.  The single was a number-one hit on the U.S. R&B chart for two weeks.  "Do You Get Enough Love" was written by Bunny Sigler and produced by Sigler and Kenny Gamble.

References

1986 singles
1986 songs
Philadelphia International Records singles
Contemporary R&B ballads
Songs written by Bunny Sigler